Cyrus Danall Gray (born November 18, 1989) is a former American football running back. He played college football at Texas A&M University.  Gray was drafted by the Kansas City Chiefs in the sixth round of the 2012 NFL Draft. He also had brief stints during the 2016 off-season with the Denver Broncos and Atlanta Falcons.

High school career
Gray first attended Duncanville High School before DeSoto High School, where he played football and ran track. In football, he played running back for the DeSoto Eagles football team. During his award-winning junior campaign, he ran for 1,482 yards and 31 touchdowns while also hauling in 38 passes for 436 yards and two more scores, being named to the Texas Sports Writer's Association All-State Second-team as a kick returner and Third-team as a running back. As a senior, he garnered Honorable Mention 5A All-State running back honors from both The Associated Press and the Texas Sports Writer's Association after rushing for 1,975 yards and 28 touchdowns.

In track & field, Gray was one of the state's top performers in the 100-meter dash. He ran a PR of 10.74 seconds in the 100 meters at the 2007 Jesuit Sheaner Relays, placing second. In addition, he also ran 41.80 seconds on the Desoto's 4 × 100 m relay squad.

College career
As a junior in 2010, Gray rushed for 1,133 yards with 12 touchdowns and was an All-Big 12 honorable mention for the second consecutive season.

Professional career

Kansas City Chiefs
In the 2012 NFL Draft, Gray was drafted by the Kansas City Chiefs in the 6th round of the draft. Before the season, Gray was listed 5th string on the depth chart. He got his first career carry against the San Diego Chargers on September 30, 2012. It was for 15 yards. Gray finished the season with 44 yards on 7 carries.  On July 29, 2015, Gray was released by the Chiefs.

Atlanta Falcons
On August 10, 2016, Gray was signed by the Falcons. On August 29, 2016, Gray was released by the Falcons with an injury settlement.

References

External links
 
 NFL Combine bio
 Texas A&M Aggies bio

1989 births
Living people
American football running backs
Texas A&M Aggies football players
Kansas City Chiefs players
Denver Broncos players
Atlanta Falcons players
People from DeSoto, Texas
Players of American football from Texas
Sportspeople from the Dallas–Fort Worth metroplex